Olive Green may refer to:

The color olive green
RAL 6003 Olive green, a RAL color
Olive Dutton Green (1878–1930), Australian artist
Olive Green, a pen name of the American author Myrtle Reed
Olive Green, Delaware County, Ohio
Olive Green, Noble County, Ohio
Olive Green, a hamlet in Hamstall Ridware civil parish, Staffordshire, England